Fe is the second album by Mexican singer Reyli, released on April 17, 2007 (see 2007 in music) by Sony International.

Track listing

Original Release
"Todos Caben" – 4:47 (Barba, Juantorena, Él)
"Perdóname en Silencio" – 4:22 (Barba)
"Para Siempre" – 3:40 (Barba)
"Elena" – 4:17 (Barba, Castro)
"Pégale a la Pared" – 4:34 (Barba)
"Con un Pie en el Cielo" – 4:01 (Barba, Castro)
"Al Fin" – 4:55 (Barba)
"Para Que Pienses en Mí" performed by Concetta Costanzo – 3:10 (Costanzo)
"No Me Hace Falta Nada Más" – 3:42 (Barba)
"La Declaración" – 3:22 (Barba)
"Arrepentido" – 3:59 (Barba)
"Llueve y Llueve" – 4:31 (Barba)
"FE" - 3:46 (Barba, Flores)

Fe [DualDisc] (2007)

Sales and certifications

References

External links
Hear the full album at AOL Music

2007 albums
Reyli albums